Enantia lina, the white mimic white or lina mimic white, is a butterfly in the family Pieridae. It is found from Mexico to most of South America.

Subspecies
The following subspecies are recognised:
E. l. lina (Herbst, 1792)
E. l. psamathe (Fabricius, 1793) (Uruguay, Brazil: Rio de Janeiro, Bahia, Rio Grande do Sul, Mato Grosso do Sul)
E. l. mercenaria (C. & R. Felder, 1861) (Panama, Venezuela, Colombia)
E. l. aphrodite (C. & R. Felder, 1865) (Brazil: Espírito Santo, Minas Gerais)
E. l. galanthis (Bates, 1861) (Ecuador, Peru, Bolivia, Brazil: Amazonas)
E. l. acutipennis Butler, 1896 (Trinidad)
E. l. marion Godman & Salvin, [1889] (Mexico, Guatemala, Nicaragua, Panama)
E. l. versicolora (Fruhstorfer, 1912) (Brazil: Pernambuco)
E. l. virna Lamas, 2003 (Mexico)

Gallery

References

Dismorphiinae
Butterflies described in 1792
Fauna of Brazil
Pieridae of South America
Taxa named by Johann Friedrich Wilhelm Herbst